The Women's team pursuit at the 2011 UCI Track Cycling World Championships was held on March 24. 16 nations of 3 cyclists each participated in the contest. After the qualifying, the fastest 2 teams raced for gold, and 3rd and 4th teams raced for bronze.

Results

Qualifying
The Qualifying was held at 15:25.

Finals
The finals were held at 20:15.

References

2011 UCI Track Cycling World Championships
UCI Track Cycling World Championships – Women's team pursuit